Brendan Hartney (born 23 April 1958) is a former Australian rules footballer who played with Carlton in the Victorian Football League (VFL).

Notes

External links 

Brendan Hartney's profile at Blueseum

1958 births
Carlton Football Club players
Sandhurst Football Club players
Australian rules footballers from Victoria (Australia)
Living people